Unfurl is the third studio album by Australian singer-songwriter Ry X. It was released on 15 February 2019 through Infectious Music.

Track listing

Charts

References

2019 albums
Infectious Music albums
Ry X albums